The Dakar Rally (or simply "The Dakar"; formerly known as the "Paris–Dakar Rally") is an annual rally raid organised by the Amaury Sport Organisation. Most events since the inception in 1978 were staged from Paris, France, to Dakar, Senegal, but due to security threats in Mauritania, which led to the cancellation of the 2008 rally, events from 2009 to 2019 were held in South America. Since 2020, the rally has been held in Saudi Arabia. The event is open to amateur and professional entries, professionals typically making up about eighty percent of the participants.

The rally is an off-road endurance event. The terrain that the competitors traverse is much tougher than that used in conventional rallying, and the vehicles used are typically true off-road vehicles and motorcycles, rather than modified on-road vehicles. Most of the competitive special sections are off-road, crossing dunes, mud, camel grass, rocks, and erg among others. "Amateurs" typically struggle with the event. The rough terrain and lack of skill usually results in accidents and serious injuries.

History

Crossing the Sahara
The race originated in December 1977, a year after Thierry Sabine got lost in the Ténéré desert whilst competing in the 1975 "Cote-Cote" Abidjan-Nice rally and decided that the desert would be a good location for a regular rally, on the lines of the 1974 London–Sahara–Munich World Cup Rally, the first automobile race to cross the Sahara Desert.

In 1971, ex-Cream drummer Ginger Baker used the unproven Range Rover to drive from Algeria to Lagos, Nigeria to set up a recording studio and jam with Fela Kuti. Predating the Paris-Dakar Rally the subsequent documentary is replete with such terrain, and documents the vehicle's endurance.

Early growth
182 vehicles took the start of the inaugural rally in Paris, with 74 surviving the  trip to the Senegalese capital of Dakar. Cyril Neveu was the event's first winner, riding a Yamaha motorcycle. The event rapidly grew in popularity, with 216 vehicles taking the start in 1980 and 291 in 1981. The privateer spirit of early racers tackling the event with limited resources encouraged such entrants as Thierry de Montcorgé in a Rolls-Royce and Formula 1 driver Jacky Ickx with actor Claude Brasseur in a Citroën CX, in the 1981 race won by two-time winner Hubert Auriol.

In 1982, there were 382 racers, more than double the number that took the start in 1979. Neveu won the event for a third time, this time riding a Honda motorcycle, while victory in the car class went to the Marreau brothers, driving a privately entered Renault 20. Auriol captured his second bikes class victory in 1983, the first year that Japanese manufacturer Mitsubishi competed in the rally, beginning an association that would last until 2009.

At the behest of 1983 car class winner Jacky Ickx, Porsche entered the Dakar in 1984, with the total number of entries now at 427. The German marque won the event at their first attempt courtesy of René Metge, who had previously won in the car category in 1981, whilst Ickx finished sixth. Gaston Rahier meanwhile continued BMW's success in the motorcycle category with back-to-back wins in 1984 and 1985, the year of Mitsubishi's first victory of 12 in the car category, Patrick Zaniroli taking the spoils. The 1986 event, won by Metge and Neveu, was marred by the death of event founder Sabine in a helicopter crash, his father Gilbert taking over organisation of the rally.

Peugeot and Citroën domination

The 1987 rally marked the start of an era of increased official factory participation in the car category, as French manufacturer Peugeot arrived and won the event with former World Rally champion Ari Vatanen. The 1987 event was also notable for a ferocious head-to-head duel between Neveu and Auriol in the motorcycle category, the former taking his fifth victory after Auriol was forced to drop out of the rally after breaking both ankles in a fall. The 1988 event reached its zenith in terms of entry numbers, with 603 starters. Vatanen's title defence was derailed when his Peugeot was stolen from the service area at Bamako. Though it was later found, Vatanen was subsequently disqualified from the event, victory instead going to compatriot and teammate Juha Kankkunen.

Peugeot and Vatanen returned to winning ways in 1989 and 1990, the latter marking Peugeot's final year of rally competition before switching to the World Sportscar Championship. Sister brand Citroën took Peugeot's place, Vatanen taking a third consecutive victory in 1991. The 1991 event also saw Stéphane Peterhansel take his first title in the motorcycle category with Yamaha, marking the beginning of an era of domination by the Frenchman.

For the 1992 event, the finish line moved to Cape Town, South Africa in a bid to combat a declining number of competitors, where GPS technology was used for the first time. Auriol became the first person to win in multiple classes after taking Mitsubishi's second victory in the car class, while Peterhansel successfully defended his motorcycle category title. The 1993 rally entry list slumped to 153 competitors, around half of the preceding year's figure and around a quarter of that of 1988. The event was the last to be organised by Gilbert Sabine and the Amaury Sport Organisation took over the following year. With the finish line now back in its traditional location of Dakar, Bruno Saby won a third title for Mitsubishi and Peterhansel took a third straight success in the motorcycle category.

The 1994 event returned to Paris after reaching Dakar, resulting in a particularly grueling event. Pierre Lartigue took Citroën's second win in acrimonious circumstances, as Mitsubishi's leading drivers were forced to withdraw from exhaustion after traversing some particularly demanding sand dunes in the Mauritanian desert that the Citroën crews had opted to skip. Peterhansel's did not compete due to a disagreement between Yamaha and the race organizers over the regulations. Edi Orioli claimed a third title in the bikes category. The 1995 and 1996 events begin in the Spanish city of Granada, with Lartigue racking up wins for Citroën in both years. Peterhansel returned to take a fourth bikes category win in 1995, but lost to Orioli in 1996 because of refuelling problems.

Mitsubishi in the ascendancy

The 1997 rally ran exclusively in Africa for the first time, with the route running from Dakar to Agadez, Niger and back to Dakar. Citroën's withdrawal due to a rule change paved the way for Mitsubishi to take a fourth victory. Japan's Kenjiro Shinozuka became the first non-European to win the event. Peterhansel equalled Neveu's record of five motorcycle category wins in 1997, before going one better in 1998, when the event returned to its traditional Paris-Dakar route. 1998, Dakar veteran Jean-Pierre Fontenay posted another win for Mitsubishi in the car class.

1999 started in Granada and a maiden success for erstwhile Formula One and sports car driver Jean-Louis Schlesser, who had been constructing his own buggies since 1992. With the help of Renault backing, Schlesser overcame the works Mitsubishi and Nissan crews to win, whilst Peterhansel's decision to switch to the car category allowed Richard Sainct to take BMW's first title in the bikes category since 1985. Schlesser and Sainct both successfully defended their titles in 2000, traversing the route from Dakar to the Egyptian capital of Cairo.

2001 was the final time that the rally used the familiar Paris-Dakar route, and was notable for Mitsubishi's Jutta Kleinschmidt, as she was the first woman to win the rally - albeit only after Schlesser was penalised one hour for unsportsmanlike conduct. Fabrizio Meoni took the first Dakar win for Austrian manufacturer KTM, beginning a winning streak that lasted through 2019. The 2002 began in the French town of Arras and long-time Dakar participant Hiroshi Masuoka won the event for Mitsubishi (Masouka had led for much of the previous year's rally.) The 2003 rally featured an unorthodox route from Marseille to Sharm El Sheikh. Masuoka defend his title after teammate and long-time leader Peterhansel was plagued by mechanical problems in the penultimate stage. Sainct meanwhile took honours in the motorcycle category, the third title for both him and KTM.

Mid-2000s
By 2004, the entry list had increased to 595, up from 358 in 2001, with a record 688 competitors starting in 2005. Alongside Mitsubishi and Nissan, Volkswagen now boasted a full factory effort, while Schlesser's Ford-powered buggies and BMWs of the German X-raid team proved thorns in the side of the big budget works teams. The 2004 route was from Clermont-Ferrand to Dakar, and was the year Peterhansel emulated Hubert Auriol's feat of winning the rally on both two wheels and four. The Frenchman defended his title in 2005, when the rally began for the first time in Barcelona. In the bikes category, KTM continued their success with Nani Roma in 2004, who switched to the car category the following year, and Cyril Despres in 2005.

The 2006 event moved to Lisbon. Nissan pulled out having failed to provide effective opposition to Mitsubishi, who took a sixth consecutive victory, this time with former skiing champion Luc Alphand after Peterhansel committed a series of errors late in the rally. Peterhansel made amends in 2007, however, taking his third title in the car category for Mitsubishi after a close contest with Alphand after the increasingly competitive Volkswagens retired with mechanical problems. In what would be the final African event of the Dakar, Despres took his second title in the bikes category, having conceded victory in 2006 to Marc Coma after suffering an injury.

2008 Dakar Rally cancelled
The 2008 event, due to start in Lisbon, was cancelled on 4 January 2008 amid fears of attacks in Mauritania following the 2007 killing of four French tourists. Chile and Argentina offered to host subsequent events, which were later accepted by the ASO for the 2009 event.

The ASO also decided to establish the Dakar Series competition, whose first event was the 2008 Central Europe Rally, held in Hungary and Romania, which acted as a replacement for the cancelled 2008 edition of the Dakar.

South America

The 2009 event, the first held in South America with a respectable 501 competitors, saw Volkswagen take its first win in the Dakar as a works entrant courtesy of Giniel de Villiers. Initially, Teammate and former WRC champion Carlos Sainz led the race comfortably until crashing out, but went on to win the event in 2010. After a poor showing in 2009, Mitsubishi withdrew from the competition and left Volkswagen as the sole works entrant. The German marque won the race for a third time in 2011, this time with Nasser Al-Attiyah, before they withdrew to focus on their upcoming WRC entry and leaving the Dakar with no factory participants in the car class. In the bikes, Despres and Coma stretched KTM's incredible unbroken run of success. Both tied on three victories apiece after Coma's third win in 2011.

In the 2012 rally, the X-raid team came to the fore, now using Minis in lieu of BMWs. Peterhansel had joined the team in 2010 after Mitsubishi's departure, but had been unable to challenge the Volkswagen drivers. Following Volkswagen's withdrawal, Peterhansel was able to secure his fourth win in the car category and his tenth in total, his main opposition coming from within his own team. Peterhansel successfully defended his title in 2013 as the Damen Jefferies buggies of Sainz and Al-Attiyah failed to last the distance. Despres also racked up a further two wins for KTM in the bikes class in 2012 and 2013, bringing his tally to five, aided by Coma's absence due to injury in the latter year. Coma struck back on his return to the Dakar in 2014, taking a comfortable fourth title and a 13th in succession for KTM, whilst Nani Roma emulated Auriol and Peterhansel by taking his maiden title in the cars class a decade on from his victory on two wheels - albeit only after team orders by X-raid slowed down Peterhansel.

Peugeot returned for the 2015 event with an all-new, diesel-powered, two-wheel drive contender, but failed to make an impact as X-raid's Minis once more dominated. Al-Attiyah won the event in his second year for the team, while Coma racked up a fifth title in the bikes after the defection of long-time rival Despres to the car class and Peugeot. Peugeot did however see success in 2016 with Peterhansel behind the wheel, racking up his 6th win in the car category, and again in 2017 and 2018 until Peugeot decide to officially leave the competition. In 2019 Toyota won for the first time with Nasser Al-Attiyah (in his third victory with three different manufacturers). The bike category saw the KTM works team rider, Australian Toby Price, take his first Dakar victory, winning his second title in 2019. Sam Sunderland and Matthias Walkner won the 2017 and 2018 edition also for the team from Mattighofen (18 overall victories as in 2019).

Saudi Arabia
The rally has been held in Saudi Arabia since 2020. Since 2022, the rally has been the season-opening round of the World Rally-Raid Championship jointly sanctioned by the Fédération Internationale de l'Automobile and Fédération Internationale de Motocyclisme. The 2023 event ran from 31 December 2022 to 15 January 2023.

Vehicles and classes
The five competitive groups in the Dakar are the motorcycles, quads, the cars class (which ranges from buggies to small SUVs), UTVs, and the trucks class. Many vehicle manufacturers use the rally's harsh environment as both a testing ground and an opportunity to show off their vehicles' durability even though most vehicles are heavily modified from their production specification or purpose-built.

Motorbikes

For the 2005 rally regulations introduced a limit of 450cc for twin cylinder motorbikes. Single cylinder motorbikes were still open class with no capacity limit.

As of 2011, the engine displacement limit for all motorbikes competing in the Dakar Rally is 450cc. Engines may be either single or twin cylinder. Riders are divided into two groups, "Elite" (Group 1) and Non-Elite (Group 2), with the latter subdivided into two further groups - the "Super Production" (Group 2.1) and "Marathon" (Group 2.2) classes. "Marathon" competitors are not permitted to change such key components as the engine (including the engine case, cylinders and cylinder heads), the frame, the forks or swinging arm, whereas those in the "Super Production" and "Elite" classes may replace these components.

A subcategory is the "Original by Motul" category (formerly named "Malle Moto" due to the only piece of luggage competitors were allowed to take with them was a "malle", a French term for box or trunk.), which refers to motorbikes and quads competing without any kind assistance. The organization provides assistance for this category with 4 people dedicated to the transportation of the competitors "malle" or boxes between bivouac sites plus any additional equipment or belongings. This includes: 1 trunk, 1 set of wheels, 1 sleeping tent, 1 travel bag, 1 set of tyres, free use of the generators, compressors and tool-boxes, and easy access to race information. Since these competitors are not allowed to receive any outside support, each rider must service their own vehicle. It is often called the category for the toughest of the tough, and one for the Dakar purists.

KTM has dominated the motorcycle class in recent years, although Honda, Yamaha, Sherco, Husqvarna, and Gas Gas also compete currently. BMW and Cagiva have also enjoyed success in the past.

Quads

Prior to 2009, Quads were a subdivision of the motorbike category, but they were granted their own separate classification in 2009 and are designated Group 3 in the current regulations. They are divided into two subgroups - Group 3.1, which features two-wheel drive quads with a single cylinder engine with a maximum displacement of 750cc, and Group 3.2, which permits four-wheel drive quads with a maximum engine displacement of 900cc, in either single or twin cylinder layout.

Yamaha are unbeaten in the Quad category since 2009, with their main current opposition coming courtesy of Honda and Can-Am.

Cars

The T1 Group is made up of "Improved Cross-Country Vehicles", subdivided according to engine type (petrol or diesel) and drive type (two-wheel or four-wheel drive). The T2 Group is made up of "Cross-Country Series Production Vehicles", which are subdivided into petrol and diesel categories, while the T3 Group is for "Light Vehicles". There is also an "Open" category catering for vehicles conforming to SCORE regulations.

Mini have been the most successful marque in the car category in recent years, thanks to the efforts of the non-factory X-raid team, with limited involvement currently coming from Toyota, Ford and Haval. Several constructors also produce bespoke buggies for the event, most notably SMG and Damen Jefferies.

Mitsubishi is historically the most successful manufacturer in the car class, with Volkswagen, Citroën, Peugeot and Porsche having all tasted success in the past with factory teams. Jean-Louis Schlesser has also won the event twice with his Renault-supported buggies. Factory teams from Nissan and SEAT have also won stages, as has BMW, courtesy of the X-raid team.

Trucks

Trucks participating in the competition are subdivided into "Series Production" trucks (T4.1) and "Modified" trucks (T4.2), whilst Group T4.3 (formerly known as T5) trucks are rally support trucks - meaning they travel from bivouac to bivouac to support the competition vehicles. These were introduced to the rally in 1998. The truck event was not run in 1989 after it was decided the vehicles, by this stage with twin engines generating in excess of 1000 horsepower, were too dangerous following the death of a DAF crew member in an accident during the 1988 rally.

Kamaz has dominated the truck category since the turn of the century, although it has come under increasing pressure from rivals such as Iveco, MAN, Renault, and Tatra, which enjoyed much success in the 1990s. Hino, DAF, Perlini, and Mercedes-Benz have also been among the winners in the past. In the 21st century Kamaz almost always won the truck class, winning fourteen out of eighteen times.

UTVs
The utility task vehicle (UTV) category was introduced in 2017. Before this, UTVs ran under the car category as the T3 class. The class rapidly gained in popularity, and in 2021 the class was further subdivided into separate T3 light prototypes category, and T4 SSVs, which are based on production vehicles.

Classics
A new Dakar Classic class was introduced in 2021 for cars and trucks manufactured before 2000, or new vehicles built to original pre-2000 specification. These vehicles share the same bivouac and the organization but run in a parallel, yet different route, suitable for historic vehicles. The scoreboard is not based on fastest time, but rather on regularity rally point scoring system. The class feature a reduced entry fee, yet the same rules and fees apply for the assistance.

List of winners

Cars, bikes and trucks

Quads and SSVs

Source:

Light Prototypes and Classics

Source:

Podium

Cars

Bikes

Trucks

Quads

SSVs (UTVs until 2022)

Light Prototypes

Classics

Records

Television coverage
The rally is broadcast on television in more than 190 countries. A live feed of the event and a roundup of each day's race progress is made into a 26-minute programme. This has been commentated on by Toby Moody for ten years, and more recently by Neil Cole.

The rally organizers and their television crews provide 20 edit stations along the route for various countries to produce their own programmes about the rally. There are four TV helicopters, six stage cameras, and three bivouac crews to make over 1,000 hours of TV over the two-week period.

A 2006 television documentary Race to Dakar described the experiences of a team, including the English actor Charley Boorman, in preparation for and entry into the 2006 Dakar Rally.

Video games

Incidents

In 1982, Mark Thatcher, son of the then British Prime Minister Margaret Thatcher, along with his French co-driver Anne-Charlotte Verney and their mechanic, disappeared for six days. On 9 January, the trio became separated from a convoy of vehicles after they stopped to make repairs to a faulty steering arm. They were declared missing on 12 January. Thatcher, Verney, and the mechanic were all unharmed.

The organiser of the rally, Thierry Sabine, was killed when his Ecureuil helicopter ("Squirrel-copter") crashed at 7:30 p.m. on Tuesday 14 January 1986, into a dune at Mali during a sudden sand-storm. Also killed onboard was the singer-songwriter Daniel Balavoine, helicopter pilot François-Xavier Bagnoud, journalist Nathalie Odent, and Jean-Paul Lefur who was a radiophonic engineer for French radio broadcaster RTL (formerly Radio Luxembourg).

Six people were killed during the 1988 race, three participants and three local residents. In one incident, Baye Sibi, a 10-year-old Malian girl, was killed by a racer while she crossed a road. A film crew's vehicle killed a mother and daughter in Mauritania on the last day of the race. The race participants killed, in three separate crashes, were a Dutch navigator on the DAF Trucks team, a French privateer, and a French rider. Racers were also blamed for starting a wildfire that caused a panic on a train running between Dakar and Bamako, where three more people were killed.

In 2003, French driver Daniel Nebot both rolled and crashed his Toyota heavily at high speed killing his co-driver Bruno Cauvy.

In 2005, Spanish motorcyclist José Manuel Pérez died in a Spanish hospital on Monday 10 January after crashing the week before on the 7th stage. Italian motorcyclist Fabrizio Meoni, a two-time winner of the event, became the second Dakar Rally rider to die in two days, following Pérez on 11 January on stage 11. Meoni was the 11th motorcyclist and the 45th person overall to die in the history of the race. On 13 January a five-year-old Senegalese girl was hit and killed by a service lorry after wandering onto a main road, bringing the total deaths to five.

In 2006, 41-year-old Australian KTM motorcyclist Andy Caldecott, in his third time in the Dakar, died on 9 January as a result of neck injuries sustained in a crash approximately  into stage 9, between Nouakchott and Kiffa, only a few kilometers (miles) from the location where Meoni had his fatal wreck the year before. He won the third stage of the 2006 event between Nador and Er Rachidia only a few days before his death. The death occurred despite efforts by the event organisers to improve competitor safety, including limiting speed, mandatory rest at fuel stops, and reduced fuel tank capacity for the bike classes. On 13 January a 10-year-old boy died while crossing the course after being hit by a car driven by Latvian Māris Saukāns, while on 14 January a 12-year-old boy was killed after being hit by a support lorry.

In 2007, 29-year-old South African motor racer Elmer Symons died of injuries sustained in a crash during the fourth stage of the Rally. Symons crashed with his bike in the desert between Er Rachidia and Ouarzazate, Morocco. Another death occurred on 20 January, the night before the race's finish, when 42-year-old motorcyclist Eric Aubijoux died suddenly. The cause of death was initially believed to be a heart attack, but it was later suggested that Aubijoux had died of internal injuries sustained in a crash earlier that day while competing in the 14th stage of the race.

The 2008 Dakar Rally was cancelled due to security concerns after al-Qaeda's murder of four French tourists on Christmas Eve in December 2007 in Mauritania (a country in which the rally spent eight days), various accusations against the rally calling it "neo-colonialist", and al-Qaeda's accusations against Mauritania calling it a supporter of "crusaders, apostates and infidels". The French-based Amaury Sport Organisation in charge of the  rally said in a statement that they had been advised by the French government to cancel the race, which had been due to begin on 5 January 2008 from Lisbon. They said direct threats had also been made against the event by al-Qaeda related organisations.

Omar Osama bin Laden, the son of Osama bin Laden, attracted news coverage in 2008 by promoting himself as an "ambassador of peace" and proposing a  horse race across North Africa as a replacement to the Dakar Rally, with sponsors' money going to support child victims of war, saying "I heard the rally was stopped because of al-Qaida.  I don't think they are going to stop me."

On 7 January 2009, the body of 49-year-old motorcyclist Pascal Terry from France was found. He had been missing for three days and his body lay on a remote part of the second stage between Santa Rosa de la Pampa and Puerto Madryn.

On 4 January 2010, a woman watching the Dakar Rally was killed when a vehicle taking part in the race veered off the course and hit her during the opening stage.

On 1 January 2012, motorcyclist Jorge Martinez Boero of Argentina died after suffering a cardiac arrest after a fall. He was treated by medical staff within five minutes of the accident, but died on the way to hospital.

On 7 January 2015, motorcycle rider Michal Hernik died in unknown circumstances during Stage 3 of the 2015 rally.

On 12 January 2020, Portuguese motorcycle rider Paulo Gonçalves died after suffering a heart attack due to a crash on the seventh stage.

On 15 January 2021, motorcyclist Pierre Cherpin of France died. The 52-year-old Frenchman fell off his motorcycle on 10 January, and a rescue team in a helicopter found him unconscious in the desert. He was rushed to a hospital in Saudi Arabia where he was treated for his injuries. He sustained serious head injuries and cracked ribs, and one of his lungs also collapsed.  Cherpin underwent emergency neurosurgery and was placed in an artificial coma. Doctors were initially optimistic about his recovery path and there were no complications after the surgery. He died during the medical transfer from Jeddah to France.

Overall, 76 people, including 31 competitors, have died in the Dakar Rally.

Criticism
When the race was held in Africa, it was subject to criticism from several sources, generally focusing on the race's impact on the inhabitants of the African countries through which it passed. Some African residents along the race's course in previous years have said they saw limited benefits from the race; that race participants spent little money on the goods and services local residents can offer. The racers produced substantial amounts of dust along the course, and were blamed for hitting and killing livestock, in addition to occasionally injuring or killing people.

After the 1988 race, when three Africans were killed in collisions with vehicles involved in the race, PANA, a Dakar-based news agency, wrote that the deaths were "insignificant for the [race's] organisers". The Vatican City newspaper L'Osservatore Romano called the race a "vulgar display of power and wealth in places where men continue to die from hunger and thirst." During a 2002 protest at the race's start in Arras, France, a Green Party of France statement described the race as "colonialism that needs to be eradicated".

The rally was criticised before 2000 for crossing through the disputed territory of Western Sahara, which has been occupied by Morocco since 1975, without the approval of the Polisario Front independence movement, which considers itself the representative of the indigenous Sahrawi people. After the race officials gained formal permission from the Polisario from 2000 onwards this ceased to be an issue.

The environmental impact of the race has been another area of criticism. This criticism of the race is the topic of the song "500 connards sur la ligne de départ" ("500 Arseholes at the Starting Line"), on the 1991 album Marchand de cailloux by French singer Renaud. In 2014, the Dakar rally was criticized for damage done to archaeological sites in Chile.

The move to Saudi Arabia for the 2020 Dakar Rally was under heavy criticism because of the situation of human rights in Saudi Arabia and the position of women in that country.

Despite the criticism from human rights organizations against the choice of host country for the 2020 season, the Dakar Rally was organized in Saudi Arabia for another consecutive year. While it was being denounced as an attempt of sportswashing by Saudi Arabia, the organizers defended the decision.

See also
 Africa Eco Race - rally raid launched in 2009 in response to the Dakar's move to South America
 Budapest-Bamako – Desert Rally
 Mint 400
 Rallye des Pharaons
 Peking to Paris
 Hellas Rally

Notes

References

External links

Official website (multilingual)

 
1979 establishments in France
1979 establishments in Senegal
Off-road racing
Recurring sporting events established in 1979
Rally raid races
Motorcycle races
Motorsport in Africa
Motorsport in South America
Sports competitions in Paris
Sports competitions in Dakar
Motorsport in France
Motorsport in Senegal
Pre-Cross Country Rally World Cup races
Sports controversies
Controversies in Africa
Controversies in Saudi Arabia